The Nixon Administration and the Death of Allende's Chile: A Case of Assisted Suicide is a 2005 nonfiction book by Jonathan Haslam, detailing the Nixon administration's role in the overthrow of Salvador Allende, and further CIA efforts in Cuba.

References

2005 non-fiction books
Books about Chile
Books about Richard Nixon
Verso Books books